Aldercar and Langley Mill is a civil parish in the Amber Valley district of Derbyshire, England.  The parish contains four listed buildings that are recorded in the National Heritage List for England.  All the listed buildings are designated at Grade II, the lowest of the three grades, which is applied to "buildings of national importance and special interest".  The parish contains the villages of Aldercar and Langley Mill and the surrounding area.  The oldest building is Codnor Castle, which is listed, together with a nearby farmhouse and farm building.  The other listed building in the parish is a church in Langley Mill.


Buildings

References

Citations

Sources

 

Lists of listed buildings in Derbyshire